Che Gossett is a trans femme writer, and archivist. They have written extensively on black and trans visibility, black trans aesthetics, racial capitalism, and queer, trans and black radicalism, resistance and abolition.

Early Life 
Gossett grew up in Massachusetts with their sibling, activist and filmmaker Tourmaline. They received their Doctorate in Women's and Gender Studies from Rutgers University in 2021.

Publications 
They have published their writing in Trap Door: Trans Cultural Production and the Politics of Visibility, Death and Other Penalties: Continental Philosophers on Prisons and Capital Punishment, Transgender Studies Reader, The Scholar & Feminist Online, Los Angeles Review of Books, and Frieze. Gossett has lectured and performed at The Museum of Modern Art, MoMA PS1, Whitney Museum of American Art, New Museum and A.I.R. Gallery.

Fellowships and Awards 

Visiting Scholar, Oxford Centre for Life Writing (2023)
 Gloria E. Anzaldúa Award from the American Studies Association (2014)
 Sylvia Rivera Award in Transgender Studies from the Center for Gay and Lesbian Studies at the City University of New York (2014)
 Martin Duberman Research Scholar Award from the New York Public Library (2014)
 2017-2018 Queer Arts Mentor

References

Living people
People from Massachusetts
Transgender writers
Year of birth missing (living people)
21st-century LGBT people
Non-binary writers